Leucophyllum (barometer bush or barometerbush) is a genus of evergreen shrubs in the figwort family, Scrophulariaceae, native to the southwestern United States and Mexico. It is sometimes placed in the family Myoporaceae. The dozen-odd species are often called "sages", although they have no relationship to the genus Salvia.

The solitary axillary flowers are bell- or funnel-shaped, with five lobes and two lips, and colors ranging from white to magenta to purple. The generic name is derived from the Greek words λευκός (leukos), meaning "white," and φυλλον (phyllos), meaning "leaf," referring to the trichome-covered foliage.

These shrubs are found in sandy soils and have a high salt tolerance. They have become popular for edge and area plantings in warmer areas and in xeriscaping; they require minimal water, are easily shaped into hedges, and bloom over their entire surface. Cultivars of L. frutescens, L. candidum,
L. laevigatum, L. langmaniae, L. pruinosum, L. revolutum, and L. zygophyllum have been developed.

Leucophyllum shrubs are legendary for their ability to "forecast" rain, usually blooming several days prior to a rainstorm, apparently in response to humidity.  They are sometimes called "barometer bush" for this reason. It is believed to be a survival trait in the plants' semi-desert habitats.

Selected species
Leucophyllum alejandrae  G.L. Nesom 
Leucophyllum ambiguum Bonpl. 
Leucophyllum candidum I.M.Johnst. – Brewster County barometer bush
Leucophyllum flyrii B.L. Turner 
Leucophyllum frutescens (Berland.) I.M.Johnst. – Texas sage, Texas ranger, silverleaf
Leucophyllum hintoniorum G.L. Nesom
Leucophyllum laevigatum Standl. – Chihuahuan sage
Leucophyllum langmaniae Flyr – Langman's sage, Rio Bravo sage
Leucophyllum minus A.Gray – Big Bend barometer bush
Leucophyllum mojinense Henrickson & T. Van Devender
Leucophyllum pringlei (Greenm.) Standl. 
Leucophyllum pruinosum I.M.Johnst.
Leucophyllum revolutum Rzed.
Leucophyllum ultramonticola Flyr
Leucophyllum zygophyllum I.M.Johnst.

Hybrids
Leucophyllum × 'Heavenly Cloud' (L. frutescens 'Green Cloud' × L. laevigatum)
Leucophyllum × 'Rain Cloud' (L. frutescens × L. minus)

References

External links
Page on L. frutescens from Texas Native Plants Database

 
Scrophulariaceae
Scrophulariaceae genera
Flora of Mexico
Flora of the United States
Taxa named by Alexander von Humboldt
Taxa named by Aimé Bonpland